Waterbury is a city in the U.S. state of Connecticut on the Naugatuck River,  southwest of Hartford and  northeast of New York City. Waterbury is the second-largest city in New Haven County, Connecticut. According to the 2020 US Census, in 2020 Waterbury had a population of 114,403. As of the 2010 census, Waterbury had a population of 110,366, making it the 10th largest city in the New York Metropolitan Area, 9th largest city in New England and the 5th largest city in Connecticut.

Throughout the first half of the 20th century, Waterbury had large industrial interests and was the leading center in the United States for the manufacture of brassware (including castings and finishings), as reflected in the nickname the "Brass City" and the city's motto Quid Aere Perennius? ("What Is More Lasting Than Brass?"). It was also noted for the manufacture of watches and clocks (Timex).

The city is alongside Interstate 84 (Yankee Expressway) and Route 8 and has a Metro-North railroad station with connections to Grand Central Terminal. Waterbury is also home to Post University and the regional campuses of the University of Connecticut, University of Bridgeport, Western Connecticut State University as well as Naugatuck Valley Community College.

History

The land was originally inhabited by the Algonquin bands. According to Samuel Orcutt's history, some Puritan residents of nearby Farmington "found it expedient to purchase the same lands from different tribes, without attempting to decide between their rival claims." The original settlement of Waterbury in 1674 was in the area now known as the Town Plot section. In 1675, the turbulence of King Philip's War caused the new settlement to be vacated until the resumption of peace in 1677. A new permanent location was found across the river to the east along the Mad River. The original Native American inhabitants called the area "Matetacoke" meaning "the interval lands." Thus, the settlement's name was Anglicised to "Mattatuck" in 1673. When the settlement was admitted as the 28th town in the Connecticut Colony in 1686, the name was changed to Waterbury in reference to the numerous streams that emptied into the Naugatuck River from the hills on either side of the valley.  At that time, it included all or parts of what later became the towns of Watertown, Plymouth, Wolcott, Prospect, Naugatuck, Thomaston, and Middlebury.

Growth was slow during Waterbury's first hundred years, the lack of arable land due to the constant flooding of the Naugatuck River in particular, discouraged many potential settlers.  Furthermore, the residents suffered through a great flood in 1691 and an outbreak of disease in 1712.  After a century, Waterbury's population numbered just 5,000.

Waterbury emerged as an early American industrial power in the early 19th century when the city began to manufacture brass, harnessing the waters of the Mad River and Naugatuck River to power the early factories. The new brass industry attracted many immigrant laborers from all over the world, leading to an influx of diverse nationalities. Waterbury was incorporated as a city in 1853 and, as the "Brass Capital of the World", it gained a reputation for the quality and durability of its goods. Brass and copper supplied by Waterbury were used in Nevada's Boulder Dam among myriad applications across the United States.

A famous Waterbury product of the late-19th century was Robert H. Ingersoll's one-dollar pocket watch, five million of which were sold. After this, the clock industry became as important as Waterbury's brass industry. Evidence of these industries can still be seen in Waterbury, as numerous clocktowers and old brass factories have become landmarks of the city.

Waterbury produced silverware starting in 1858 by Rogers & Brother, and in 1886 by Rogers & Hamilton. In 1893, Rogers & Brother exhibited wares at the World's Columbian Exposition in Chicago. In 1898, both companies became part of the International Silver Company, headquartered in nearby Meriden. Production continued at the R&B site until 1938. Designs of the two companies are in the collections of the Mattatuck Museum in Waterbury, the Brooklyn Museum in New York, the Yale University Art Gallery in New Haven, and in many historical societies and museums across the United States.

In June 1920, labor unrest occurred, with striking workers fighting with police on the street. Over 30 were arrested, mostly Lithuanians, Russians, Poles, and Italians. The strikers numbered some 15,000, with most being employed at Scovill, Chase Rolling Mill, and Chase Metal Works. One striker was shot to death by police.

At its peak during World War II, 10,000 people worked at the Scovill Manufacturing Co, later sold to Century Brass. The city's metal manufacturing mills (Scovill Manufacturing, Anaconda American Brass, and Chase Brass & Copper were the largest) occupied more than 2 million square feet (180,000 m2) and more than 90 buildings.

On May 24, 1962, the north side of the city was devastated by a high-end F3 tornado that caused widespread damage, destroyed numerous neighborhoods, and left one dead and 50 injured. Damage from the storm was estimated to be at least $5 million.

Historic events
 Waterbury Land Company was formed in 1807, for the purpose of settling a Connecticut Western Reserve Township named Columbia in Lorain County, Ohio. The draft allotment was purchased for $21,600.
 Waterbury's Fr. Michael J. McGivney founded the Knights of Columbus in New Haven, Connecticut, on February 2, 1882. Though the first councils were in Connecticut, the Order spread throughout the United States.
 Established in 1894, St. Joseph's Church holds the distinction of being the first Lithuanian worshiping community in Connecticut and second oldest in the country.
 The first Unico Club was founded in Waterbury in 1922 by Dr. Anthony P. Vastola. It grew to 8,000 members and 150 regional groups. The membership is composed of business and professional people of Italian lineage or those who are married to an Italian-American. The clubs sponsor educational, cultural and civic programs.
 Sacred Heart was the first Catholic high school in Connecticut, September 6, 1922.
 One of the first full-length sound motion pictures was made in the 1920s at the studios of the Bristol Co. at Platts Mills by Professor William Henry Bristol, who experimented for years with sound pictures.
 The Waterbury Clock Company produced the Mickey Mouse watch in 1933 under the Ingersoll brand. The watch was so popular that over 11,000 were sold the first day, and it saved the company from bankruptcy.
 W1XBS in Waterbury was one of four radio stations in the country that began experimental high fidelity broadcasting in 1934. The station broadcast at 1530 kHz, and joined the CBS Radio Network on December 1, 1938. They moved to 1590 kHz in 1941, in accordance with the North American Regional Broadcasting Agreement. The station's broadcasting license was cancelled in 1998 to allow New York's WWRL to be upgraded after that station purchased it; at the time it had been known as WQQW.
 Victor Zembruski started his Polish Eagles show on Waterbury radio station WATR in 1934.  called "The Zembruski Family Polka Hour", it is one of the oldest continuously broadcast shows on American radio.
 The Chase Dispensary, a medical clinic for employees of the Chase Brass & Copper Co., opened one of the first birth control clinics in the country in 1938.

Geography

Waterbury lies in the humid continental climate zone, and normally sees cold, snowy winters and warm, humid summers.

Neighborhoods
Waterbury's neighborhoods are shaped by the history and geography of the city.

Ethnic communities distinguish the city's 25 neighborhoods. Clusters of shops at the street corners created villages within the city. For many people, home, work and community life was contained within their neighborhood. Downtown, a short walk away, was "the city", offering live theater, fancy stores, parades and spectacles.

 Brooklyn
 Bucks Hill
 Bunker Hill
 Country Club
 Crownbrook
 Downtown
 East End
 East Mountain
 Fair Lawn
 Fairmount
 Gilmartin
 Hillside
 Hopeville
 Long Hill
 North End
 North Square
 Overlook
 Pine Hill
 Robinwood
 South End
 Town Plot
 Washington Hill
 Waterville
 West Side
 WOW / Walnut-Orange-Walsh

Demographics

As of the census of 2010, there were 110,366 people, 42,761 households, and 26,996 families residing in the city. There were 42,761 housing units at an average density of 1,492.0 per square mile. The racial makeup of the city was 58.8% White, 20.1% Black or African American, 0.6% Native American, 1.8% Asian, 0.1% Pacific Islander, 14.2% from other races, and 4.6% from two or more races. Hispanic or Latino people of any race were 31.2% of the population.

Waterbury has a large Italian-American population with 21.46% of its residents claiming Italian heritage. The Italian influence is especially strong in the Town Plot, Brooklyn, and North End neighborhoods. Additionally, the city is home to thriving Albanian, Cape Verdean, Dominican, Brazilian, Jamaican, Lithuanian,
Portuguese, and Puerto Rican communities. Waterbury also has a large Irish community, especially in the Washington Hill section which is home to the city's annual St. Patrick Day's Parade, which, oddly enough, is rarely held on St. Patrick's Day itself. At the beginning of the 21st century, Waterbury had a growing Orthodox Jewish population. Waterbury had a significant Jewish population beginning in the late 1800s, initially as a result of German immigration. The first synagogue in Waterbury opened in 1872. In the early 20th century, almost 9,000 Jews immigrated from Eastern Europe, with many fleeing persecution. The Orthodox Jewish community has experienced a renaissance since 2000 due to efforts by educators and developers to create an affordable alternative to the high cost of living in established Orthodox communities in New York and New Jersey. This renaissance began with the founding of the Yeshiva K'tana of Waterbury in 2000; as of 2014, this full-service elementary and middle school has nearly 400 students. Other educational institutions are the Yeshiva Gedolah of Waterbury, which includes a mesivta high school and beit medrash (undergraduate) program for approximately 230 students, a Bais Yaakov school for girls, and a kolel. As of the end of 2014, the Waterbury Orthodox community numbers 180 families and includes a mikveh, eruv, and community services such as Hatzalah and Chaverim.

There were 42,622 households, out of which 31.2% had children under the age of 18 living with them, 34.7% were married couples living together, 28.4% had a single householder with no husband present, and 36.9% were non-families. 31.4% of all households were made up of individuals, and 12.1% had someone living alone who was 65 years of age or older. The average household size was 2.46 and the average family size was 3.11.

In the city, the population was spread out, with 25.6% under the age of 18, 10.1% from 18 to 24, 27.4% from 25 to 44, 24.3% from 45 to 64, and 12.6% who were 65 years of age or older. The median age was 35.2 years. For every 100 females, there were 89.9 males. For every 100 females age 18 and over, there were 85.8 males.

According to the 2014 5-year American Community Survey (conducted 2010–2014, data released December 3, 2015), the median income for a household in the city was $41,136, compared to $69,899 statewide. In Waterbury, 24.2% of the population, or 26,122 residents of the city, lived below the poverty line, compared to 10.5% statewide. In Waterbury, 36.8% of the child population age 0–17, or 9,984 children in the city, lived below the poverty line, compared to 14% statewide.

Economy
Waterbury's economic decline in the 1970s and 1980s resulted in it being ranked as having the worst quality of life of 300 U.S. metropolitan areas by Money Magazine in 1992. Waterbury was also rated as one of the "Worst Places for Businesses and Careers in America" by Forbes Magazine in April 2008. Regardless, the city was named on the 100 Best Places to Raise a Family list in the same year.

According to the city's 2010 Comprehensive Annual Financial Report, the top employers in the city are:

Arts and culture

Landmarks
Union Station, constructed in 1900.
Holy Land USA, a park with an illuminated cross on a hill, was one of Connecticut's most popular tourist attractions in the 1960s and 1970s.
Municipal Stadium, built in 1930.
The Apothecary Building, built in 1893.
A statue on the Carrie Welton Fountain.
Soldiers' Monument, sculpted by Waterbury resident George Edwin Bissell as a tribute to the American Civil War.
Elton Hotel, built in 1905.
The Cass Gilbert National Register District, founded after architect Cass Gilbert won a competition to design Waterbury's City Hall.
The statue of Christopher Columbus, by sculptor Frank Gaylord (1984).
The Ben Franklin statue (1921), by sculptor Paul Wayland Bartlett, a Waterbury resident.
Waterbury Courthouse, the former headquarters of the Anaconda American Brass Company.
The Waterbury Clock Company buildings, constructed in 1857. By the end of the 19th century, the company employed 3,000 workers and manufactured 20,000 clocks and watches per day. During World War II, it was the largest producer of fuse timers for precision defense products in the United States.
The Harrub Pilgrim Memorial (1930), by Hermon Atkins MacNeil.
Chief Two Moon Meridas Laboratory, where Two Moon Meridas manufactured herbal medications.
Mattatuck Museum Arts and History Center, dedicated to collecting and exhibiting Connecticut artists and sculptors.
Brass Mill Center, a shopping venue.
The Palace Theatre (1922).

Government

Waterbury has about 52,000 registered voters, of whom about 24,000 are Democrats. There are about 7,800 registered Republicans and the balance are largely unaffiliated, with a smattering belonging to minor parties.

John S. Monagan, who was a prolific author in addition to his political responsibilities, served as Waterbury's mayor from 1943 to 1948. He also served as its district's congressional representative from 1959 to 1973. George Harlamon, a member of the Waterbury Hall of Fame, was the city's 40th mayor. He served from 1969 to 1970 during a period of racial tension. The city is known for its hard-nosed political culture compared locally to Cook County, Illinois, close elections, and a number of scandals.

Waterbury's scandalous past dates back to 1940, when Mayor T. Frank Hayes and 22 others were convicted of conspiracy to defraud the City of Waterbury. Hayes received a 10–15 year sentence and served six years. Ironically, the massive corruption scheme was exposed with the help of then comptroller Sherwood Rowland, grandfather of Gov. John G. Rowland, who was convicted on corruption charges in 2004. What appeared to have been a defeat for Hayes was not really a victory for Pape, and the stage was set for further corruption in Waterbury in the second half of the 20th century. Waterbury was in serious financial straits due to years of mismanagement, resulting in the city's finances being taken over by the State of Connecticut. The State Oversight Board oversaw city business for several years and have since left following consecutive years of balanced budgets. In 1992 former Mayor Joseph Santopietro was sentenced to nine years in prison following a public corruption conviction. The successors to Philip Giordano, former acting mayor Sam Caligiuri (2001) and former mayor Michael Jarjura (2001–2011) managed the city without major controversy since 2001. Democrat Neil O'Leary was elected the 46th Mayor of Waterbury on November 9, 2011.

In 1939, Pape backed an attempt to install council-manager government and single-transferable-vote elections. The local Republican Party and Connecticut General Assembly also supported this measure. New York Mayor Fiorello H. La Guardia helped campaign for its passage, having backed similar reforms in his own city in 1936.

A number of presidential candidates have campaigned in Waterbury due to its pivotal role in statewide elections. The most famous was the election eve visit on the Green by John F. Kennedy in 1960. Forty thousand people waited until 3am on the Green to greet Kennedy on Sunday, November 6, 1960. Sen. Kennedy spoke to them from the balcony of the Roger Smith Hotel (now called the Elton). Pierre Salinger later said it was the greatest night of the campaign. In September 1984 Ronald Reagan held a huge noontime election rally at the same location. In July 2006 former president Bill Clinton made a campaign appearance at the Palace Theatre for Senator Joe Lieberman during his campaign for re-election to the U.S. Senate. Shortly after the Democratic primary, Tom Swan, campaign manager for Lieberman's opponent Ned Lamont, described Waterbury as a place where "the forces of slime meet the forces of evil," after a large majority of the town's voters backed Lieberman. Swan claimed he was referring to former mayor Philip A. Giordano and former governor John G. Rowland.

Governor John G. Rowland served ten months in a federal prison until February 10, 2006. He was released from federal prison with the stipulation that he serve four months house arrest with an electronic ankle bracelet monitor until June 2006.

In January 2008 Waterbury Mayor Michael Jarjura announced that he would hire Rowland as an economic development advisor for the city. Rowland began work in February that year receiving an annual salary of $95,000 as the city's economic development coordinator funded in conjunction with the Greater Waterbury Chamber of Commerce.

In 2011, the Board of Aldermen voted to eliminate funding the city's portion of his salary and in November 2011 Rowland stated he would give up his position when his contract expired thus ending his quasi-city employment.

Later that year, following his victory over then Mayor Jarjura, new mayor Neil O'Leary created the position of Economic Development Director as part of his new administration, removing the duties from the Chamber of Commerce and bringing them directly into City Hall, making Economic Development a cornerstone of his administration. Ron Pugliese was hired as the first director to hold the position.

Education
Public schools are operated by Waterbury Public Schools, under the leadership of a superintendent and a board of education consisting of ten elected members and the city mayor, who acts as  chairman ex-officio.  Schools include:

High schools
 Crosby High School
 Kennedy High School
 Waterbury Arts Magnet School
 Wilby High School
 Waterbury Career Academy High School

Middle schools
 North End Middle School
 Wallace Middle School
 West Side Middle School

Elementary schools

 B.W. Tinker Elementary School
 Bucks Hill Elementary School
 Bunker Hill Elementary School
 Carrington Elementary School
 Chase Elementary School
 Driggs Elementary School
 Duggan Pre-K–8 School
 F.J Kingsbury Elementary School
 Generali Elementary School
 Hopeville Elementary School
 John G. Gilmartin Elementary School
 Jonathan Reed Pre-K–8 School
 Maloney Interdistrict Magnet School
 Regan Elementary School
 Rotella Interdistrict Magnet School
 Sprague Elementary School
 Walsh Elementary School
 Washington Elementary School
 Wendell Cross Elementary School
 Woodrow Wilson Elementary School

Religious schools
Alpha and Omega Christian Academy
Catholic Academy of Waterbury (A merge of the closed Blessed Sacrament & St. Mary's Schools)
Holy Cross High School
Our Lady of Mt. Carmel School
Sacred Heart High School
Sacred Heart Middle School
Yeshiva Gedolah of Waterbury
Yeshiva K'tana of Waterbury

Colleges and universities
Naugatuck Valley Community College
Post University
University of Bridgeport (Regional Campus)
University of Connecticut (Regional Campus / Downtown Waterbury) 
Western Connecticut State University (Regional Campus)

Media
Two newspapers are operated within Waterbury: the Republican-American, which covers 36 communities throughout Western Connecticut, and the Waterbury Observer. WATR 1320 AM, a radio station under the same family ownership since 1934 and broadcasting on the same frequency since 1939, operates a News/Talk/Classic Hits music format and is the only radio station broadcasting in Waterbury.
Two FM radio stations are also located in Waterbury: WWYZ 92.5, which plays a country music format and WMRQ 104.1, which plays alternative rock. They both transmit from 10 miles away in Meriden and have wide-reaching signals that can be heard clearly as far away as Bridgeport.

WCCT-TV (channel 20) is licensed to Waterbury and serves as Hartford's affiliate for The CW; it is operated out of the Hartford Courant building with sister Tribune Broadcasting Fox affiliate WTIC-TV (channel 61), and carries mainly syndicated content outside of network hours.

Infrastructure

Transportation

Commuting in the Greater Waterbury area consists of multiple public transportation options.  the CT Transit through Northeast Transportation Company, operates a significant number of city buses running from the Waterbury's city center at Exchange Place to various neighborhoods in the city.  In 2014 the Hartford-New Britain Busway was opened, a local bus runs to Waterbury, Cheshire, Southington and New Britain an express bus to run between Waterbury and Hartford.

Metro-North Railroad runs commuter trains multiple times a day between the Waterbury station and Bridgeport, with connections to Grand Central Terminal in New York City. Waterbury's Union Station, built in 1909 for the New York, New Haven and Hartford Railroad, is now closed for use as a railway station and part of the building is now the headquarters of the Republican-American newspaper.  Passengers traveling to and from Waterbury board and alight on a concrete platform adjacent to the old station.  There are no ticket agents at Waterbury, which is currently the end of the line for the Waterbury Branch.

The two main highways that run through the heart of the city are I-84 (Yankee Expressway) and Route 8. In the downtown area, I-84 and Route 8 are located on the elevated William W. Deady Bridge, known locally as the "MixMaster" with eastbound traffic on the upper deck and westbound traffic on the lower deck. The interchange is ranked as one of the most heavily congested traffic areas in the New York/Connecticut region. Waterbury–Oxford Airport is the primary airport serving the city. Bradley International Airport (BDL) in Windsor Locks and Tweed New Haven Airport (HVN) in East Haven are the closest commercial airports to Waterbury.

Police department
The Waterbury Police Department was founded in 1853. The department has a police academy.

Fire department
Waterbury Fire Department is a full-time, paid department, which operates eight fire stations, under the command of a Battalion Chief and a Deputy Chief.

Notable people 

 Fritz Barzilauskas, NFL player
 Michael Bergin, one of first male supermodels, actor on TV's Baywatch
 William F. Bolger, United States Postmaster General 1978–1985
 Darren Brass, tattoo artist, reality show character, from TLC hit show Miami Ink
 William H. Bristol, inventor and manufacturer, born in Waterbury; invented "Bristolphone" to simultaneously record voices and other sounds with motion in moving pictures
 Nixzmary Brown, murder victim
 John Caneira, former MLB player
 Lucia Chase, dancer, actress, ballet director
 Joe Cipriano, television announcer (also known as Tom Collins on WWCO in Waterbury) for Deal or No Deal and 1 vs. 100
 Deirdre Coleman-Imus, Waterbury-born actress; married radio personality Don Imus in 1995
 Scott Conant, chef, restaurateur, food personality, and cookbook author
 Roger Connor, player in Baseball Hall of Fame
 Bob Crane, actor, of Hogan's Heroes fame; born in Waterbury and worked at Connecticut radio stations before moving to California
 Justin Credible, professional wrestler
 Patrick DeLeon, former president of American Psychological Association and former chief of staff for Senator Daniel Inouye
 Andre "mrDEYO" Deyo, singer-songwriter, best known for writing "Jenny From The Block" for Jennifer Lopez in 2002; graduated from John F. Kennedy High School
 Allie DiMeco, actress, best known for playing Rosalina on The Naked Brothers Band on Nickelodeon
 Joe Diorio, jazz guitarist and theorist, author, teacher at University of Southern California
 Red Donahue, pitcher for six different MLB teams
 Damane Duckett, offensive tackle for NFL's San Francisco 49ers; also played for New York Giants and Carolina Panthers
 Feodor Fedorenko, Nazi war criminal (born in Crimea, deported in 1984)
 Kevin Foster, athlete, actor and Guinness World Record holder
 Robert Gallo, biomedical researcher, known for role in identifying Human Immunodeficiency Virus (HIV) as infectious agent responsible for Acquired Immune Deficiency Syndrome (AIDS)
 Mordechai Gifter, one of America's leading Torah scholars, served as rabbi of Waterbury's Jewish community from 1941 to 1945
 Philip Giordano, former mayor of Waterbury (R), stripped of power in 2001 after investigation revealed alleged sexual acts with a minor and other possible pedophilia charges
 Robert D. Glass (1922–2001), first African American justice of the Connecticut Supreme Court (1987–1992)
 Ralph Goldstein (1913–1997), Olympic épée fencer
 Ryan Gomes, pro basketball player, attended Wilby High School
 Porter Goss, former director of CIA
Tony Hanson, UConn Husky of Honor attended Holy Cross High School
 George P. Harlamon, Mayor 1968–1970; elected to Waterbury Hall of Fame 2003
 Jahana Hayes, U.S. Congresswoman, born in Waterbury
 David Hoadley, president of Panama Railway
 Frank Hogan, former district attorney of New York County
 Samuel Hopkins, American Congregationalist and theologian
 Julius Hotchkiss (1810–1878), congressman and mayor of Waterbury
 Joan Joyce, All-American softball player; also excelled in basketball, bowling, and golf
 Fred Klobedanz, Major League Baseball pitcher
 Gerald Lamb (1924–2014), Waterbury alderman; Connecticut State Treasurer (1963–1970) and the first African American elected to that office in the US since the Reconstruction era
 Annie Leibovitz, celebrated portrait photographer, born in Waterbury in 1949
 Clare Leighton, artist and printmaker, buried in Waterbury in 1989
 Baruch Levine, Jewish music singer-songwriter, and rebbi (teacher) in the Yeshiva Ketana of Waterbury
 Michael Mallory, professional basketball player
 Harold Marcuse, professor of German history at University of California Santa Barbara and grandson of Herbert Marcuse
 Mercedes Martinez, professional wrestler
 Richard A. Mastracchio, NASA astronaut
 Ethel Maynard, first black woman to serve in the Arizona legislature
 Dylan McDermott, actor, star of television series The Practice
 Winifred McDonald, schoolteacher, politician, Secretary of the State of Connecticut (1949–1951)
 Michael J. McGivney, Catholic priest and founder of the Knights of Columbus
 Bill Meek, football head coach, Kansas State, Houston, Utah
 Two Moon Meridas, lived in Waterbury 1914 to 1933, claimed to be full-blooded Pueblo Indian
 George Metesky (1903–1994), "Mad Bomber" who launched reign of terror in New York City in 1940s and 1950s
 John S. Monagan (1911–2005), mayor, congressman, biographer of Oliver Wendell Holmes, Jr.
 Johnny Moore (1902–1991), professional baseball player
 David Nolan, author and historian who attended Anderson School
 Neil O'Leary, mayor of Waterbury
 Mario Pavone, jazz bassist, composer and bandleader
 Jimmy Piersall, professional baseball player and broadcaster
 Derek Poundstone, professional strongman athlete; won America's Strongest Man contest in 2007
 Peter Pronovost, intensive care specialist at Johns Hopkins Hospital, named by TIME magazine in 2008 as one of the 100 most influential people in the world
 Sheryl Lee Ralph, Tony Award-nominated Jamaican-American actress and singer best known for her work in Broadway productions such as Dreamgirls
 Mark Richards, United States House of Representatives and seventh Lieutenant Governor of Vermont
 John G. Rowland, Waterbury native and former governor of Connecticut (R); resigned from office on July 1, 2004, after prolonged investigation for corruption
 Rosalind Russell, actress
 Tarah Lynne Schaeffer, actress, best known for playing Tarah on Sesame Street
 Velvet Sky, wrestler, TNA Knockouts champion
 Caswell Silver, geologist, president of Sundance Oil Company, established Caswell Silver Foundation at University of New Mexico
 Leon Silver, geologist who trained Apollo astronauts in lunar geology
 John Sirica, Watergate judge; Time magazine's Man of the Year in 1973, born in Waterbury in 1904
 Richard V. Spencer, Former United States Secretary of Defense (2017–2019)
 Terry Tata, Major League Baseball umpire from 1973 to 1999; officiated four World Series and three All-Star games during his career
 Thomas Tessier, writer of horror novels and short stories, born in Waterbury in 1947
 Gene Tierney, actress; attended St. Margaret's School for Girls in Waterbury, but grew up in Brooklyn borough of New York City
 Fay Vincent, 8th commissioner of Major League Baseball
 Dave Wallace, Major League Baseball pitcher, coach and general manager
 Krista Watterworth, interior designer, television presenter

In popular culture

The Secret Life of Walter Mitty, by James Thurber, is set in Waterbury in the 1930s.
 In the 1996 movie Happy Gilmore, the "Waterbury Open" is a golf tournament held in Waterbury.
 Gladys Taber's romance novel, Give Me the Stars (1945), was set in Waterbury and in the Chase Brass and Copper Company's factory, giving vivid depictions of factory life during World War II.
 The Today Show on NBC was broadcast from the Hotel Elton on August 18, 1955, to cover the festivities for the world premiere of Waterbury native Rosalind Russell's movie The Girl Rush at the State Theater that evening. A major flood on August 19, 1955, caused over 50 million dollars in property damage and the deaths of 29 Waterbury residents; The Today Show provided live coverage of the flood to the country.
 Waterbury appeared in Ken Burns' documentary miniseries The War as one of four American towns whose history and residents' experiences during World War II were examined in depth.
 Greetings Tour came to Waterbury and painted a large mural of Waterbury's history.

Sister cities
 Pontelandolfo, Campania, Italy
 Struga, North Macedonia

See also

National Register of Historic Places listings in New Haven County, Connecticut

References

Further reading 
 William J. Pape, The History of Waterbury and Naugatuck Valley. In Three Volumes. Chicago: S.J. Clarke Publishing Co., 1918. Volume 1 | Volume 2 | Volume 3

External links

 Waterbury, Connecticut
 Waterbury History & Genealogy
 Waterbury Economic Development

 
1677 establishments in Connecticut
Albanian-American history
Cities in Connecticut
Cities in New Haven County, Connecticut
Cities in the New York metropolitan area
Greater Waterbury, Connecticut
Italian-American culture in Connecticut
Little Italys in the United States
Hispanic and Latino American culture in Connecticut
Populated places established in 1674
Populated places established in 1677